David Jude Bezold (born 1965) is an American college basketball coach and a former head coach of the men's basketball team at Northern Kentucky University. He oversaw the team's reclassification to Division 1. He graduated from Holy Cross High School in Covington, Kentucky in 1984.

Head coaching record

References

Living people
Basketball coaches from Kentucky
College men's basketball head coaches in the United States
College men's basketball players in the United States
Northern Kentucky Norse men's basketball coaches
Viterbo University alumni
Sportspeople from Covington, Kentucky
1965 births
American men's basketball players